| occupation         = 
| module2            = 
}}
Ahllam (born 1991) is an Iranian-Emirati singer of Khaliji music, musician and dancer. She is known for her contributions to Persian pop music and arabic music.

Early life and education 
Ahllam was born in Ahvaz, Iran. Her father was from Ahvaz, while her mother was from Tehran. Her grandfather is of Dubai origins. developed an interest in music at a precocious age. Her family encouraged her to pursue music and solfège classes with Iranian pop and folk music celebrity Ebi.

Career 
She started his activities first in Iran and underground and then moved to Dubai and now lives there. After that he released the songs "Best", "Devil", "Del Divooneh". And "I regret" performed by Avang Music. She is artwork is broadcast on Gala Networks and PMC TV.

Discography

Singles

References

External links 
 
 
 Ahllam on Spotify

Living people
Emirati women singers
Folk guitarists
Association football midfielders
Iranian footballers
Iran international footballers
1991 births